Lucrèce Nussbaum (born 7 October 1986) is a Swiss ice hockey coach and former Swiss national ice hockey team defenceman. She is the head coach of the Mount Allison Mounties women's ice hockey program of U Sports.

Playing career
From 2006 to 2011, Nussbaum played for the St. Thomas (New Brunswick) Tommies women's ice hockey program in Fredericton, New Brunswick. For three consecutive years, she captured the Tommies team award for Best Defensive Player. In 2010, she was selected as an Atlantic University Sport Second Team All-Star.

International
Nussbaum was selected for the Switzerland national women's ice hockey team in the 2010 Winter Olympics. She played in all five games, scoring a goal and two assists. She has also appeared for Switzerland at three IIHF Women's World Championships. Her first appearance came in 2007.

Career statistics

International career

Coaching career
On 30 July 2020, Nussbaum was hired to be the head coach for the Mount Allison Mounties women's ice hockey program, a member of the Atlantic University Sport conference of U Sports women's ice hockey.

Awards and honors
2007–08 St. Thomas Defensive Player of the Year
2008–09: St. Thomas Defensive Player of the Year
2009–10: St. Thomas Defensive Player of the Year
2009–10 Atlantic University Sport Second Team All-Star

References

External links

1986 births
Living people
Ice hockey players at the 2010 Winter Olympics
Olympic ice hockey players of Switzerland
People from Kreuzlingen District
Swiss women's ice hockey defencemen
St. Thomas (Canada) Tommies women's ice hockey players
U Sports coaches
Swiss ice hockey coaches
Sportspeople from Thurgau